Chirico may refer to:

People
Cosimo Chiricò (born 1991), Italian footballer
Emanuel Chirico, businessman in the apparel industry
Federico Chirico (born 1989), Italian footballer
Giuseppe Chirico (late 19th-century), Italian boss of the Camorra
Louisa Chirico (born 1996), American tennis player
Luca Chirico (born 1992), Italian racing cyclist
Marcelo Chirico (born 1992), Uruguayan equestrian and show jumping competitor
Steve Chirico (born 1960), mayor of Naperville, Illinois, U.S.

Places
San Chirico Nuovo, a town and comune in the province of Potenza, Italy
San Chirico Raparo, a town and comune in the province of Potenza, Italy

Characters
Chirico Cuvie, protagonist of the animated series Armored Trooper Votoms

See also
De Chirico
Di Chirico

Italian-language surnames